The nominal power is the nameplate capacity of photovoltaic (PV) devices, such as solar cells, modules and systems, and is determined by measuring the electric current and voltage in a circuit, while varying the resistance under precisely defined conditions. The nominal power is important for designing an installation in order to correctly dimension its cabling and converters.

The peak power is not the same as the power under actual radiation conditions. In practice, this will be approximately 15-20% lower due to the considerable heating of the solar cells.
Moreover, in installations where electricity is converted to AC, such as solar power plants, the actual total electricity generation capacity is limited by the inverter, which is usually sized at a lower peak capacity than the solar system for economic reasons. Since the peak DC power is reached only for a few hours each year, using a smaller inverter allows to save money on the inverter while clipping (wasting) only a very small portion of the total energy production. The capacity of the power plant after DC-AC conversion is usually reported in WAC as opposed to Wp or WDC.

Standard test conditions

The nominal power of PV devices is measured under standard test conditions (STC), specified in standards such as IEC 61215, IEC 61646 and UL 1703. Specifically, the light intensity is 1000 W/m2, with a spectrum similar to sunlight hitting the earth's surface at latitude 35°N in the summer (airmass 1.5), the temperature of the cells being 25 °C. The power is measured while varying the resistive load on the module between an open and closed circuit (between maximum and minimum resistance). The highest power thus measured is the 'nominal' power of the module in watts. This nominal power divided by the light power that falls on a given area of a photovoltaic device (area × 1000 W/m2) defines its efficiency, the ratio of the device's electrical output to the incident energy.

Watt-peak 

The International Bureau of Weights and Measures, which maintains the SI-standard, states that the physical unit and its symbol should not be used to provide specific information about a given physical quantity and that neither should be the sole source of information on a quantity. Nonetheless, colloquial English sometimes conflates the quantity power and its unit by using the non-SI unit watt-peak and the non-SI symbol Wp prefixed as within the SI, e.g. kilowatt-peak (kWp), megawatt-peak (MWp), etc. As such a photovoltaic installation may for example be described as having "one kilowatt-peak" in the meaning "one kilowatt of peak power". Similarly outside the SI, the peak power is sometimes written as "P = 1 kWp" as opposed to "Ppeak = 1 kW". In the context of domestic PV installations, the kilowatt (kW) is the most common unit for peak power, sometimes stated as kWp.

Conversion from DC to AC 

Solar power need to be converted from direct current (DC, as it is generated from the panel) to alternate current (AC) to be injected into the power grid. Since solar panels generate peak power only for few hours each year, and DC to AC converters are expensive, the converters are usually sized to be smaller than the peak DC power of the panels. This means that for few hours each year the peaks are "clipped" and the extra energy is lost. This has very little impact on the total energy generated throughout a year, but saves considerable amount of balance of system (BOS) costs. 
Due to under-sizing of converters, AC ratings of solar plants are generally significantly lower than DC ratings, as much as 30%. This in turn increases the calculated yearly capacity factor of the plant.
The downrating of peak power and the related clipping is different from the losses incurred in the conversion from DC to AC, which happen at any power level and are usually relatively small.

Most countries refer to installed nominal nameplate capacity of PV systems and panels by counting DC power in watt-peak, denoted as Wp, or sometimes WDC, as do most manufacturers and organizations of the photovoltaic industry, such as Solar Energy Industries Association (SEIA), the European Photovoltaic Industry Association (EPIA) or the International Energy Agency (IEA-PVPS). 
Some grid regulations may limit the AC output of a PV system to as little as 70% of its nominal DC peak power (Germany). Because of these two different metrics, international organizations need to reconvert official domestic figures from the above-mentioned countries back to the raw DC output in order to report coherent global PV-deployment in watt-peak.

In order to clarify whether the nominal power output (watt-peak, Wp) is in fact DC or already converted into AC, it is sometimes explicitly denoted as MWDC and MWAC or kWDC and kWAC. The converted WAC is also often written as "MW (AC)", "MWac" or "MWAC". Just as for Wp, these units are non SI-compliant but widely used. In California, for example, where the rated capacity is given in MWAC, a downrating of 15 percent in the conversion from DC to AC is assumed.

Cost per watt 

Although watt-peak is a convenient measure, and is the standardized number in the photovoltaic industry on which prices, sales and growth numbers are based, it is arguably not the most important number for actual performance. Since a solar panel's job is to generate electric power at minimal cost, the amount of power that it generates under real-life conditions in relation to its cost should be the most important number to evaluate. This cost per watt measure is widely used in the industry.

It can happen that a panel from brand A and a panel of brand B give exactly the same watt-peak in laboratory test, but their power output is different in a real installation. This difference can be caused by different degradation rates at higher temperatures.  At the same time, though brand A can be less productive than brand B it may as well cost less, thus it has a potential of becoming financially advantageous. An alternative scenario can also be true: a more expensive panel may produce so much more power that it will outperform a cheaper panel financially. An accurate analysis of long-term performance versus cost, both initial and ongoing, is required to determine which panel may lead the owner to better financial results.

Power output in real conditions 

The output of photovoltaic systems varies with the intensity of sunshine and other conditions. The more sun, the more power the PV module will generate.  Losses, compared to performance in optimal conditions, will occur due to non-ideal alignment of the module in tilt and/or azimuth, higher temperature, module power mismatch (since panels in a system are connected in series the lowest performing module defines performance of the string it belongs to), aging factor, soiling and DC to AC conversion.  The power a module generates in real conditions can exceed the nominal power when the intensity of sunlight exceeds 1000 W/m2 (which corresponds roughly to midday in summer in, for example, Germany), or when sun irradiation close to 1000 W/m2 happens at lower temperatures.

Nominal power rating of solar PV plants is not comparable with the name plate MCR rating of conventional power plants as there is wide difference between its DC and AC ratings (30% to 40%). The net power that can be fed by a coal fired / nuclear power plant is around 90% of its name plate MCR after deducting internal consumption. Similarly for CCGT, around 97% of site rating and for GTPP or Hydro electric plant above 99% of site rating. The installation cost/MW generally given for Solar PV based on DC capacity is skewed when compared to net MCR of other power generation sources (including wind power and solar thermal ). The actual installation cost of solar PV is around 50% more to compare with net MCR  of other sources for giving equal input (MW) to the AC power grid.

References 

Renewable energy economy
Units of power
Photovoltaics